Miguel Ángel Rimba Alvis (born November 1, 1967 in Riberalta) is a former Bolivian football defender. He played 80 international matches for the Bolivia national team.

Career
Rimba made three appearances in the 1994 FIFA World Cup and was part of the squad that reached the final of the Copa América in 1997. He made his debut on May 25, 89 in a friendly match against Paraguay in Cochabamba.

He played the majority of his club career for Bolívar where he won six Bolivian league titles (1988, 1991, 1992, 1994, 1996, 1997).

Towards the end of his career he played in Argentina with Atlético Tucumán, he then had short spells with Oriente Petrolero, Real Santa Cruz and Aurora before his retirement in 2003.

Over the course of his career he had 63 Copa Libertadores appearances and scored a goal.

Honours

Club
 Bolívar (6)
 Liga de Fútbol Profesional Boliviano: 1988, 1991, 1992, 1994, 1996, 1997

References

External links
International statistics at rsssf

rsssf.com

1967 births
Living people
People from Vaca Díez Province
Bolivian footballers
Bolivia international footballers
Bolivian expatriate footballers
1994 FIFA World Cup players
1989 Copa América players
1991 Copa América players
1993 Copa América players
1995 Copa América players
1997 Copa América players
1999 Copa América players
Association football defenders
Club Bolívar players
Oriente Petrolero players
Club Aurora players
Atlético Tucumán footballers
Expatriate footballers in Argentina